Yeoksam Station is a station on Line 2 of the Seoul Subway. It is located in Yeoksam-dong, Gangnam-gu, Seoul.

Station layout

Vicinity

Exit 4 : Kukkiwon (World Taekwondo Headquarters)
Exit 7 : Cha Hospital, LG Arts Center

References

Seoul Metropolitan Subway stations
Metro stations in Gangnam District
Railway stations opened in 1982
1982 establishments in South Korea
20th-century architecture in South Korea